The Archdeacon of Ardfert was a senior ecclesiastical officer within the Anglican Diocese of Limerick, Ardfert and Aghadoe from the early thirteenth century to the early twentieth. As such he was responsible for the disciplinary supervision of the clergy  within his part of the Diocese of Ardfert (until 1666); and then the combined diocese of Limerick, Ardfert and Aghadoe.

The archdeaconry can trace its history back to Florence who held the office in 1227. Two incumbents went on to hold bishoprics: John Smith (bishop of Killala and Achonry) and Raymond d’Audemar Orpen.  Edward Day, Archdeacon 1782-1788, was a much-loved local figure, "a man of great erudition and unbounded benevolence". His grand-nephew Anthony Denny was also Archdeacon. The last discrete incumbent was William Foley.

References

Archdeacons of Ardfert
Lists of Anglican archdeacons in Ireland